t Zand may refer to several settlements:

In Belgium:
 in Bruges

In the Netherlands:
't Zand, Alphen-Chaam in North Brabant
't Zand, Altena in North Brabant
't Zand, Hattem in Gelderland
't Zand, Nijmegen in Gelderland
't Zand, Schagen in North Holland
Het Zand, Utrecht in Utrecht
't Zandt in Groningen